This is a list of terrestrial ecoregions as compiled by the World Wildlife Fund (WWF). The WWF identifies terrestrial, freshwater, and marine ecoregions.

The terrestrial scheme divides the Earth's land surface into 8 biogeographic realms, containing 867 smaller ecoregions. Each ecoregion is classified into one of 14 major habitat types, or biomes.

In 2017 the WWF team revised ecosystem names and boundaries in the Arabian Peninsula, drier African regions, and Southeastern United States.

Additional ecoregions for Antarctic Realm are currently being incorporated (based on Terauds et al. 2012).
Antarctic Realm - Tundra Biome:
1 North-east Antarctic Peninsula;
2 South Orkney Islands;
3 North-west Antarctic Peninsula;
4 Central south Antarctic Peninsula;
5 Enderby Land; 
6 Dronning Maud Land;
7 East Antarctica; 
8 North Victoria Land; 
9 South Victoria Land; 
10 Transantarctic Mountains; 
11 Ellsworth Mountains; 
12 Marie Byrd Land; 
13 Adelie Land; 
14 Ellsworth Land; 
15 South Antarctic Peninsula.

Terauds, A, SL Chown, F Morgan, HJ Peat, DJ Watts, H Keys, P Convey, DM Bergstrom. 2012. Conservation biogeography of the Antarctic. Diversity and Distributions 1–16.

See also
 Global 200
 List of marine ecoregions (WWF)

References 

 Ricketts, Taylor H., Eric Dinerstein, David M. Olson, Colby J. Loucks, et al. (1999). Terrestrial Ecoregions of North America: a Conservation Assessment. Island Press, Washington DC.

External links

 The Encyclopedia of Earth: List of ecoregions, with full articles on most of them
 WWF List of Nearctic Ecoregions with links to the other realms
 List of ecoregions
 North American Ecoregions by map at bioimages.vanderbilt.edu (by list)

terrestrial
terrestrial